Cirsium kawakamii is a flowering plant in the family Asteraceae. In Chinese, it is known as the Yushan thistle, named for Yushan.

Uses
Cirsium kawakamii is cultivated for medicinal properties, particularly in Puli and Ren'ai Townships of Nantou County. C. kawakamii was believed to be depicted on the reverse side of the NT$1000 bill, near the bottom left corner, but in 2019, botanists reclassified the depicted plant as a new species, C. tatakaense.

Biology
Cirsium kawakamii typically flowers between September and October, and bears fruit between October and November.

Distribution
The known range of C. kawakamii is in alpine grasslands of north-central Taiwan, between 1,500 and 3,500 meters of elevation.

References

 

kawakamii
Endemic flora of Taiwan